Elizade University (E.U) is a private university in Ilara-Mokin, Ondo State in Nigeria. It was founded by Micheal Ade Ojo.

Elizade University has five faculties which are Faculty of Engineering, Faculty of Social and Management Sciences, Faculty of Basic and Applied Sciences, Faculty of Law and Faculty of Humanities. It has twenty four departments in these facilities all together.

Gallery

References

External links

Universities and colleges in Nigeria
Universities and colleges in Ondo State
Educational institutions established in 2013
2013 establishments in Nigeria
Private universities and colleges in Nigeria